Fred Gallagher (born 16 April 1952 in Belfast) is a World Rally Championship winning co-driver and motorsport personality.

Career
Gallagher's first WRC rally was the 1975 RAC Rally alongside Norwegian driver John Haugland in a Škoda 120S. From the 1977 season until the end of 1980 he partnered Tony Pond in the Triumph TR7 with varying success, mostly in British Rally Championship events. 1981 saw the start of a highly successful pairing with legendary Finnish driver, Henri Toivonen first in the Talbot Sunbeam before they switched to the Opel Ascona 400. The two parted company in 1984 when Toivonen signed for Lancia and Gallagher joined the Toyota team with another Finn, Juha Kankkunen. At the start of the 1986 season they parted company, with Kankkunen going to Peugeot. It was at this time that Gallagher embarked on a long and successful partnership with Björn Waldegård, mainly specialising in the Safari Rally for Toyota Team Europe. Their last rally together was the 1992 Safari during which they retired from the event due to an engine fire. Gallagher was absent from the WRC until 1998 when he started competing sporadically and without a steady driver. During this period he sat alongside Ari Vatanen, Thomas Rådström and Petter Solberg among others.

After retiring from co-driving, Gallagher became involved as a consultant or clerk of the course on various events including the WRC rallies in Corsica and Cyprus  but also in events like Race of Champions. He worked with the FIA Rally Safety Group in 2001–2005. Gallagher is still active today as a consultant within the WRC. In 2008 he was awarded  the Finnish Automobile Sport Federation's Gold Medal for his services to the nation.

External links
 World Rally Archive page
 Rally-info stats page 
 Rallybase stats page

1952 births
Living people
British rally co-drivers
World Rally Championship co-drivers
World Rally Championship people